Mohamad Arisazri bin Juhari (born 14 February 1998) is a Malaysian footballer who plays as a midfielder for Malaysia Super League club Sri Pahang.

References

1998 births
Living people
Sri Pahang FC players
Malaysian footballers
Malaysian people of Malay descent
Malaysia Super League players
Association football midfielders